The prime minister of Uganda chairs the Cabinet of Uganda, although the president is the effective head of government. Robinah Nabbanja has been the prime minister since 21 June 2021.

The post of Prime Minister was created for the first time in 1962. In 1966, Prime Minister Milton Obote suspended the Constitution, abolished the post of Prime Minister, and declared himself President. In 1980, the post of Prime Minister was re-established.

Office
The headquarters of the office of the prime minister of Uganda are located in the Twin Towers on Sir Apollo Kaggwa Road, in the Central Division of Kampala, Uganda's capital and largest city. The coordinates of the headquarters are 0°18'58.0"N,  32°35'13.0"E (Latitude:0.316111; Longitude:32.586944).

Chief minister of Uganda Protectorate

Prime ministers of Uganda Protectorate

Prime ministers of Uganda
Legend

Timeline

Organisational structure
As of October 2016, the Office of the Prime Minister oversaw several cabinet ministries and sub-ministries, including:

 First Deputy Prime Minister: Moses Ali
 Minister in Charge of General Duties, Office of the Prime Minister: Mary Karooro Okurut
 Ministry for Karamoja Affairs: headed by Minister John Byabagambi
 Minister of State for Karamoja Affairs: Moses Kizige
 Ministry of Disaster Preparedness and Refugees: headed by Minister Hilary Onek
 Minister of State for Disaster Preparedness and Refugees: Musa Ecweru
 Government Chief Whip: Ruth Nankabirwa
 Minister of State for the Northern Region: Grace Kwiyucwiny
 Minister of State for Luwero Triangle: Dennis Galabuzi Ssozi
 Minister of State for Teso Affairs: Agnes Akiror
 Minister of State for Bunyoro Affairs: Ernest Kiiza

See also
 Uganda
 President of Uganda
 List of heads of state of Uganda
 Vice President of Uganda
 Politics of Uganda
 History of Uganda
 Political parties of Uganda

References

External links
 World Statesmen – Uganda
 Rulers.org – Uganda

 
Uganda
Office of the Prime Minister of Uganda